Herbert F. Travers Jr. (May 8, 1928 – December 26, 2013) was an American attorney and judge who served as the United States Attorney for the District of Massachusetts from 1969 to 1971 and later served as a Massachusetts Superior Court judge. Born in Worcester, Massachusetts in 1928, Travers died on December 26, 2013, in Barnstable, Massachusetts.

References

College of the Holy Cross alumni
Georgetown University Law Center alumni
Massachusetts state court judges
United States Attorneys for the District of Massachusetts
1928 births
2013 deaths
People from Worcester, Massachusetts
20th-century American judges